Korea Train eXpress, often known as KTX, is South Korea's high-speed rail system, operated by Korail. Construction began on the high-speed line from Seoul to Busan in 1992. KTX services were launched on April 1, 2004.

From Seoul Station the KTX lines radiate with stops at Seoul Station, Yongsan station towards Busan and Gwangju. A new line from Wonju to Gangneung was completed in December 2017 to serve the 2018 Winter Olympics in Pyeongchang.

The initial rolling stock was based on Alstom's TGV Réseau, and was partly built in Korea. The domestically developed HSR-350x, which achieved  in tests, resulted in a second type of high-speed trains now operated by Korail, the KTX Sancheon. The next generation KTX train, HEMU-430X, achieved 421.4 km/h in 2013, making South Korea the world's fourth country after  Japan, France and China to develop a high-speed train running on conventional rail above 420 km/h.

History

Origins of the project
The Seoul-Busan axis is Korea's main traffic corridor. In 1982, it represented 65.8% of South Korea's population, a number that grew to 73.3% by 1995, along with 70% of freight traffic and 66% of passenger traffic. With both the Gyeongbu Expressway and Korail's Gyeongbu Line congested as of the late 1970s, the government saw the pressing need for another form of transportation.

The first proposals for a second Seoul-Busan railway line originated from a study prepared between 1972 and 1974 by experts from France's SNCF and the Japan Railway Technical Service on a request from the IBRD.  A more detailed 1978-1981 study by KAIST, focusing on the needs of freight transport, also came to the conclusion that separating long-distance passenger traffic on a high-speed passenger railway would be advisable, and it was adopted in the following Korean Five Year Plan.

During the following years, several feasibility studies were prepared for a high-speed line with a Seoul–Busan travel time of 1 hour 30 minutes, which gave positive results.  In 1989, following the go-ahead for the project, the institutions to manage its preparation were established: the Gyeongbu High Speed Electric Railway & New International Airport Committee, and the High Speed Electric Railway Planning Department (later renamed HSR Project Planning Board).  In 1990, the planned Seoul–Busan travel time was 1 hour 51 minutes, the project was to be completed by August 1998, and costs were estimated at 5.85 trillion South Korean won in 1988 prices, 4.6 trillion of which were to be spent on infrastructure, the remainder on rolling stock.

As planning progressed, the Korea High Speed Rail Construction Authority (KHSRCA) was established in March 1992 as a separate body with its own budget responsible for the project.  In the 1993 reappraisal of the project, the completion date was pushed back to May 2002, and cost estimates grew to 10.74 trillion won.  82% of the cost increase was due to a 90% increase in unit costs in the construction sector, mostly labour costs but also material costs, and the remainder due to alignment changes.  To finance the project, the option of a build-operate-transfer (BOT) franchise was rejected as too risky.  Funding included direct government grants (35%), government (10%) and foreign (18%) loans, domestic bond sales (31%) and private capital (6%).

Creation of the system

Start of high-speed line construction

Construction started before the choice of the main technology supplier, thus alignment design was set out to be compatible with all choices. Of the planned  line,  would be laid on bridges, and another  in tunnels. However, plans were changed repeatedly, in particular those for city sections, following disputes with local governments, while construction work suffered from early quality problems. Three competitors bid for the supply of the core system, which included the rolling stock, catenary and signalling: consortia led by GEC-Alsthom, today Alstom, one of the builders of France's TGV trains; Siemens, one of the builders of Germany's ICE trains; and Mitsubishi Heavy Industries, one of the builders of Japan's Shinkansen trains. In 1994, the alliance of GEC-Alsthom and its Korean subsidiary Eukorail were chosen as winner.

The technology was almost identical to that found on the high-speed lines of France's TGV system.

Phase 1: Seoul–Daegu and conventional line upgrades

Following the 1997 Asian Financial Crisis, the government decided to realise the Gyeongbu HSR in two phases. In a first phase, two-thirds of the high-speed line between the southwestern suburbs of Seoul and Daegu would be finished by 2004, with trains travelling along the parallel conventional line along the rest of the Seoul–Busan route. The upgrade and electrification of these sections of the Gyeongbu Line was added to the project, and also the upgrade and electrification of the Honam Line from Daejeon to Mokpo, providing a second route for KTX services. The budget for the first phase was set at 12,737.7 billion won, that for the entire project at 18,435.8 billion won in 1998 prices.  While the share of government contributions remained unchanged, the share of foreign loans, domestic bond sales and private capital changed to 24%, 29% and 2%.

The infrastructure and rolling stock were created in the framework of a technology transfer agreement, which paired up Korean companies with core system supplier Alstom and its European subcontractors for different subsystems. Alstom's part of the project amounted to US$2.1 billion or €1.5 billion.

After 12 years of construction and with a final cost of 12,737.7 billion won, the initial KTX system with the first phase of the Gyeongbu HSR went into service on April 1, 2004.

Phase 2: Daegu–Busan, extra stations, urban sections
The Daegu–Busan section of the Gyeongbu HSR became a separate project with the July 1998 project revision, with a budget of 5,698.1 billion won, with funding from the government and private sources by the same ratios as for phase 1.  In August 2006, the project was modified to again include the Daejeon and Daegu urban area passages, as well as additional stations along the phase 1 section. For these additions, the budget as well as the government's share of the funding was increased.

Construction started in June 2002. The two largest structures are the  Geomjeung Tunnel, under Mount Geumjeong at the Busan end of the line; and the  Wonhyo Tunnel, under Mount Cheonseong south-west of Ulsan, which will be the longest and second longest tunnels in Korea once the line is opened.

A long dispute concerning the environmental impact assessment of the Wonhyo Tunnel, which passes under a wetland area, caused delays for the entire project.  The dispute gained nationwide and international attention due to the repeated hunger strikes of a Buddhist nun, led to a suspension of works in 2005, and only ended with a supreme court ruling in June 2006.  With the exception of the sections across Daejeon and Daegu, the second phase went into service on November 1, 2010.  By that time, 4,905.7 billion won was spent out of a second phase budget, or 17,643.4 billion won out of the total.

The two sections across the urban areas of Daejeon and Daegu, altogether , will be finished by 2014. As of October 2010, the total cost of the second phase was estimated at 7,945.4 billion won, that for the entire project at 20,728.2 billion won.

Further upgrades of connecting conventional lines

The electrification and the completion of the re-alignment and double-tracking of the Jeolla Line, which branches from the Honam Line at Iksan and continues to Suncheon and Yeosu, began in December 2003, with the aim to introduce KTX services in time for the Expo 2012 in Yeosu. The until Masan was opened on December 15, 2010. The upgrade is to be complete until Jinju by 2012 and Suncheon by 2014.

The Ulsan–Gyeongju–Pohang section of the Donghae Line is foreseen for an upgrade in a completely new alignment that circumvents downtown Gyeongju and connects to the Gyeongbu High Speed Railway at Singyeongju Station, allowing for direct KTX access to the two cities.  On April 23, 2009, the project was approved by the government and a ground-breaking ceremony was held.  The altogether  line is slated to be opened in December 2014.

On September 1, 2010, the South Korean government announced a strategic plan to reduce travel times from Seoul to 95% of the country to under 2 hours by 2020. The conventional lines under the scope of the plan include the above, already on-going projects, and their extensions along the rest of the southern and eastern coasts of South Korea, lines along the western coast, lines north of Seoul, and the second, more easterly line between Seoul and Busan with some connecting lines.

Further high-speed lines

Honam HSR
Until 2006, the first plans for a second, separate high-speed line from Seoul to Mokpo were developed into the project of a line branching from the Gyeongbu HSR and constructed in two stages, the Honam High Speed Railway (Honam HSR). The budget for the  first stage, from the new Osong Station on the Gyongbu HSR to Gwangju·Songjeong Station, was set at 8,569.5 billion won.  The second stage, the  remaining to Mokpo, was to be finished by 2017 with a budget of 2,002.2 billion won.  The Osong-Iksan section of the first phase is also intended for use as high-speed test track for rolling stock development, to be fitted with special catenary and instrumented track.  The ground-breaking ceremony was held on December 4, 2009. As of September 2010, progress was 9.6% of the  project budget then estimated at 10,490.1 billion won for the first phase, which was due for completion in 2014, while the estimate for the entire line stood at 12,101.7 billion won.

Suseo HSR
First plans for the Honam HSR foresaw a terminus in Suseo station, southeast Seoul.  The branch to Suseo was re-launched as a separate project, the Suseo High Speed Railway (Suseo HSR), in June 2008.  Detailed design of the  line is underway since September 2010, with opening planned by the end of 2014.  For the longer term, new high-speed lines from Seoul to Sokcho on the eastern coast, and a direct branch from the Gyeongbu HSR south to Jinju and further to the coast are under consideration. In conjunction with the award of the 2018 Winter Olympics to PyeongChang in July 2011, KTX service via the eastern coast line was anticipated; the expected travel time there from Seoul is 50 minutes.

Jeju Island
In January 2009, the Korea Transport Institute also proposed a  line from Mokpo to Jeju Island, putting Jeju 2 hours 26 minutes from Seoul. The line would include a  bridge from Haenam to Bogil Island and a  undersea tunnel from Bogil Island to Jeju Island (with a drilling station on Chuja Island), for an estimated cost of US$10 billion.  As the proposal was popular with lawmakers from South Jeolla Province, the government is conducting a feasibility study, but the Jeju governor expressed skepticism. The Seoul-Jeju route has been mentioned as the world's busiest air route with 9.9 million passengers in 2011.
 However, Jeju Gov. Won Hee-ryong opposed this plan since it would ruin the island's identity and make the Jeju economy more dependent on the mainland.

Rolling stock

KTX-I

The initial KTX-I trainsets, also known as simply KTX or as TGV-K, are based on the TGV Réseau, but with several differences. 46 trains were built - the initial twelve in France by Alstom, the remainder in South Korea by Rotem. The 20-car electric multiple units consist of two traction heads, which are powered end cars without passenger compartments, and eighteen articulated passenger cars, of which the two extreme ones have one motorised bogie each.

KTX-Sancheon

For less frequented relations and for operational flexibility, a 2001 study proposed a train created by scaling down the planned commercial version of the HSR-350x, by shortening the train, removing powered bogies from intermediate cars, and lowering top speed.
Hyundai Rotem received orders for altogether 24 such trains, called KTX-II, in three batches from July 2006 to December 2008.

The power electronics uses newer technology than the HSR-350x, and the front is a new design, too. The trainsets, of which two can be coupled together, consist of two traction heads and eight articulated passenger cars, and seat 363 passengers in two classes, with enhanced comfort relative to the KTX-I.  The domestic added value of the trains was increased to 87%, compared to 58% for the KTX-I. Imported parts include the pantographs, semiconductors in the power electronics, front design, couplers and final drives.

The train was developed on the basis of the transferred TGV technology, but more advanced technology was used for the new motors, power electronics and additional brake systems, while the passenger cars were made of aluminum to save weight, and the nose was a new design with reduced aerodynamic drag.

The KTX-II was officially renamed as KTX-Sancheon (Hangul: KTX-산천) after the Korean name of the indigenous fish cherry salmon before the first units started commercial service on March 2, 2010.

However within weeks of its initial launch, mechanical and design flaws began to appear, in some cases causing trains to stop running and forcing passengers to leave the train and walk back to the station, and in one particular case derailing from the tracks on February 11, 2011. Although the trains were designed to be a domestically built replacement for the French built Alstrom trains, due to over 30 malfunctions since March 2, 2010, Korail asked manufacturer Hyundai-Rotem to recall all 19 of the trains in operation after finding cracks in two anchor bands in May 2011.
 Following the recall, the KTX-Sancheon trains were put back in service.

In addition to the 24 initial KTX-Sancheon trains, which form the KTX-Sancheon Class 11, new batches have been ordered and delivered since, to provide service on the new Honam, Suseo and Gyeonggang lines. For the opening of the Honam HSR line, 22 trainsets, named Class 12, were delivered ahead of the 2015 opening. In addition, 10 trainsets have been delivered to provide service on the Suseo line, scheduled to open in December 2016 (Class 13), and 15 trainsets (Class 14) have been ordered for the Gyeonggang Line, which opened in late 2017 ahead of the 2018 Winter Olympics

KTX-Eum 

The KTX-Eum entered service on Jungang Line on January 4, 2021, operating between electrified section of Cheongnyangni and Andong. A further order of 14 six-car units was placed in December 2016, both orders are to be delivered in 2020–2021.

List of KTX lines

Current lines

Future lines

Defunct lines

Operation

Following a phase of test operation, regular KTX service started on April 1, 2004, with a maximum speed of  achieved along the finished sections of the Gyeongbu HSR.

Services

KTX services are grouped according to their route, and within the groups, the stopping pattern changes from train to train. KTX trains not deviating from the Seoul–Busan corridor are operated as the Gyeongbu KTX service. From December 1, 2010, Korail added a pair of non-stop trains with a travel time of 2 hours 8 minutes.

Because both KTX and conventional trains in South Korea share a rail gauge (unlike in Japan), KTX trains can run on both networks dramatically increasing the number of destinations served.

Some Gyeongbu KTX services use parts of the conventional line paralleling the high-speed line. From June 2007 until October 2010, some trains left the Gyeongbu HSR between Daejeon and Dongdaegu to serve Gimcheon and Gumi before the opening of an extra station for the two cities on the high-speed line. From November 1, 2010, when most Gyeongbu KTX services began to use the new Daegu–Busan high-speed section, some trains remained on the Gyeongbu Line on that section, and additional trains began to use the Gyeongbu Line on the Seoul–Daejeon section to serve Suwon.

KTX trains using the Gyeongbu HSR only from Seoul to Daejeon and continuing all along the Honam Line are operated as the Honam KTX service. By 2017, this time is to be cut further to 1 hours 46 minutes.

The service is to be extended to Jinju by 2012. A fourth line, the Jeolla KTX service will connect Seoul to Yeosu in 3 hours 7 minutes from September 2011. From 2014, with the completion of the first phase of the Honam HSR, the travel time is reduced further to 2 hours 25 minutes. From 2015, KTX trains are to reach Pohang from Seoul in 1 hour 50 minutes.

Tickets and seats

Type of seats 
KTX offers two classes: First Class and Standard Class. Tickets also specify whether a seat is forward-facing or backward-facing according to the direction of travel. First Class seats are arranged 2+1 across the train and Standard Class seats are configured 2+2. There are special reserved Family seats, which are grouped in four, including 2 forward-facing and 2 backward-facing seats. There are reserved seats and unassigned seats.  KTX trains have no restaurant cars or bars, only seat service. From 2006, one car of selected KTX services functions as a moving cinema.

Ticket prices 

KTX fares were designed to be about halfway between those for conventional trains and airline tickets.  The fare system implemented at the start of service in April 2004 deviated from prices proportional with distance, to favour long-distance trips.  On April 25, 2005, fares were selectively reduced for relations under-performing most.

From November 1, 2006, due to rising energy prices, Korail applied an 8-10% fare hike for various train services, including 9.5% for KTX.  The price of a Seoul-Busan Standard Class ticket increased to 48,100 won.  From July 1, 2007, KTX fares were hiked another 6.5%, while those for the slower Saemaeul and Mugunghwa services on the parallel conventional route were raised by 3.5 percent and 2.5 percent, respectively.  However, new reduced weekday and unassigned seat fares were also introduced.

After the November 1, 2010, start of service on the Daegu–Busan section of the Gyeongbu HSR, the fare for KTX trains using the new section was set about 8% higher than for the old route via Miryang, while that for the new services via Suwon was set lower.

Discounts 
Korail's standard discounts for children, disabled, seniors and groups apply on KTX trains, too. For frequent travellers, Korail's standard discount cards, which are categorised according to age group, apply with the double of the standard discount rates; while discount cards for business and government agency workers apply with the normal rate; both types of discounts are up to 30%.  Season period tickets with discounts of up to 60% can also apply to KTX trains.

Discounts for family seats (37.5%) and backward facing seats (5%) are specific to the KTX.  In addition to Korail's small general discounts for tickets purchased in a vending machine, via cell phone or the internet, discounts of 5–20% apply to a limited number of seats on KTX trains when purchased in advance.  For travellers who transfer to other long-distance trains towards destinations beyond KTX stops, transfer tickets with 30% discount apply.  Korail pays a refund for late KTX trains, which reaches 100% for trains with a delay above one hour.

Korea Rail Pass, a period ticket Korail offers to foreigners, also applies to KTX.  For passengers using the Korea-Japan Joint Rail Pass, a joint offer of Korail, Japanese railways and ferry services, the discount on KTX trains is 30%.

Passenger numbers and usage

Forecasts

When the project was launched, KTX was expected to become one of the world's busiest high-speed lines. The first study in 1991 forecast around 200,000 passengers a day in the first year of operation, growing to 330,000 passengers a day twelve years later.  In forecasts prepared after the decision to split the project into two phases, the expected first year ridership of Gyeongbu KTX services was reduced by about 40%. With the estimate for the Honam KTX services added to the plan, opening year forecasts ranged between 150,000 and 175,000 passengers a day.  Actual initial ridership after the opening of the first phase in 2004 was well short of initial expectations at around half of the final forecast.

In October 2010, before the opening of the second phase, Korail expected ridership to rise from the then current 106,000 to 135,000 passengers a day.

Ridership evolution

KTX was introduced on 1 April 2004. In the first 100 days, daily passenger numbers averaged 70,250, generating an operational revenue of about 2.11 billion won per day, 54% of what was expected.  On January 14, 2005, Prime Minister Lee Hae Chan stated that "the launch of KTX was a classic policy failure" due to construction costs significantly above and passenger numbers well below forecasts. However, ridership increased by over a third on the Gyeongbu KTX and over a half on the Honam KTX in two years. Financial break-even was forecast at a ridership level of around 100,000 passengers a day, which was expected by the end of 2006.

The 100 millionth rider was carried after 1116 days of operation on April 22, 2007, when cumulative income stood at 2.78 trillion won.  KTX finances moved into the black in 2007. The next year, with revenues equal to US$898 million and costs equal to US$654 million, KTX was Korail's most profitable branch.

By the sixth anniversary in April 2010, KTX trains travelled a total 122.15 million kilometres, carrying 211.01 million passengers.  Punctuality gradually improved from 86.7% of trains arriving within 5 minutes of schedule in 2004 to 98.3% in 2009.  In 2009, the average daily ridership was 102,700. As of April 2010, the single-day ridership record stood at 178,584 passengers, achieved on January 26, 2009, the Korean New Year.

By the tenth anniversary KTX had travelled a total 240 million kilometres, carrying 414 million passengers.

Market share and effect

The introduction of high-speed services had the strongest effect on long-distance relations with a significant portion of the journey on the high-speed line, like Seoul–Busan: KTX took both the majority of the market and the bulk of rail passengers in the first year already, increasing the total share of rail from around two-fifths to a market dominating two-thirds by 2008.  On long-distance relations with significant distances along conventional lines and resulting more modest travel time gains, that is along the Honam Line, the KTX and overall rail market share gain decreases with distance.  On medium-distance relations like Seoul–Daejeon, KTX gained market share mostly at the expense of normal rail express services and air traffic, and helped to increase the total share of rail. On short-distance intercity relations line Seoul–Cheonan, due to the modest gains in time and the location of KTX stops outside city cores, KTX gains were at the expense of conventional rail, while intercity rail's modal share was little changed.

By 2007, provincial airports suffered from deficits after a drop in the number of passengers attributed to the KTX. With lower ticket prices, by 2008, KTX has swallowed up around half of the airlines' previous demand between Seoul and Busan (falling from 5.3 million passengers in 2003 to 2.4 million). Though some low-cost carriers failed and withdrew from the route, others still planned to enter competition even at the end of 2008. Budget airlines achieved a 5.6% growth in August 2009 over the same month a year earlier while KTX ridership decreased by 1.3%, a trend change credited to the opening of Seoul Subway Line 9, which improved Gimpo International Airport's connection to southern Seoul.

In the first two months after the launch of the second phase of the Gyeongbu HSR, passenger numbers on flights between Gimpo and Ulsan Airports dropped 35.4% compared to the same period a year earlier, those between Gimpo and Pohang Airports 13.2%.  Between Gimpo Airport and Busan's Gimhae International Airport, airline passenger numbers remained stable (+0.2%), as a consequence of a budget airline competing with large discounts and aggressive marketing.  In the first month of Gyeongjeon KTX service, express bus services between Seoul and Masan or Changwon experienced 30–40% drops in ridership.

Technical and operational issues

State of infrastructure
Lawmakers criticised the safety of Korail's tunnels after the Ministry of Construction and Transportation submitted data to the National Assembly on June 13, 2005. The ministry added fire prevention standards to high-speed line design standards only in November 2003, thus they weren't applied to the by then finished tunnels of the first phase of KTX. A contingency plan for fires in KTX tunnels was incorporated into a national disaster manual in November 2005.

On October 5, 2008, it was revealed by lawmakers that inside Hwanghak Tunnel, from December 2004, inspectors have monitored the progression of several cracks and minor track displacements, which continued after maintenance work in March–April 2007 and again in March 2008.  The operator claimed that a February 2007 on-site inspection found the problems not safety-relevant, but pledged further maintenance, and an investigation into the causes was launched.  Tunnel reinforcement was under way in 2010.

Incidents and accidents

Operation irregularities mostly concerned the rolling stock, but also signalling, power glitches and track problems. The number of incidents decreased from 28 in the first month to 8 in the fifth.  The failure rate decreased sharply by the fifth year of operation.  Later, in the first eight months of regular service until October 2010, KTX-II trains broke down 12 times.  Causes for breakdowns in the first years of operation involved inexperienced staff and insufficient inspection during maintenance.

Lawmakers from the Grand National Party published an investigation in October 2006 and expressed concern about the practice to use parts from other trains for spare parts, but Korail stated that that is standard practice in case of urgency with no safety effect, and the supply of spare parts is secured.  Korail is also conducting a localisation program to develop replacements for two dozen imported parts.

On June 13, 2007, near Cheongdo on the upgraded Daegu–Busan section, a damper acting between two cars of a KTX train got free at one end due to a loose screw and hit the trackbed, throwing up ballast that hit cars and caused bruises to two people on the parallel road, until the train was stopped when passengers noticed smoke.

On November 3, 2007, an arriving KTX-I train collided with a parked KTX-I train inside Busan Station, resulting in material damage of 10 billion won and light injuries to two persons.  The accident happened because the driver had fallen asleep and disabled the train protection system, and led to the trial and conviction of the driver.  The railway union criticised single driver operation in conjunction with the two and a half hours rest time the driver had between shifts.

No casualties were reported, only one passenger suffered slight injury, but KTX traffic was blocked for 29 hours while repairs were completed. Preliminary investigation indicated that the accident resulted from a series of human errors. Because workers improperly repaired a point along the tracks. Investigators found that the derailment was caused by a switch malfunction triggered by a loose nut from track, and suspected that a repairman failed to tighten it during maintenance the previous night. The switch's detectors signalled a problem earlier, however, a second maintenance crew failed to find the loose nut and didn't properly communicate the fact to the control center, which then allowed the train on the track. The rail union criticised Korail's use of hired repairmen. there were no problems with the train according to investigation.

On July 15, 2011, 150 passengers were evacuated from a train when smoke started coming out of the train when it arrived at Miryang station at 11:30 AM. On July 17, 2011, at around 11 AM, a train stopped abruptly and stranded some 400 passengers in the  Hwanghak Tunnel for over an hour. The train resumed service after emergency repairs to a malfunctioning motor. A Korail spokesperson stated that the reason for the stop was due to "faults in the motor block that supplies power to the wheels". The same day, the air conditioning broke down on another train leaving Busan at 1:45 PM. Over 800 passengers were transferred to another train at Daejeon when the problem could not be fixed.

On December 7, 2018, a KTX train carrying 198 passengers derailed about five minutes after leaving Gangneung for Seoul injuring 15 passengers.  The train was traveling at about 103 km/h when almost all of its cars left the rails.

On January 5, 2022, a KTX-Sancheon train bound for Busan from Seoul carrying 303 passengers and crew derailed at 12:58 PM while passing a tunnel in Yeongdong of North Chungcheong Province, about 215 kilometers south of Seoul, injuring 7 passengers. The train was traveling at about 200 km/h when it partially derailed, resulting in a bogie wheel from car number 4 running off the track before being violently ejected from the train, throwing up ballast and causing structural damage to train cars. Subsequent KTX traffic was rerouted via the standard line, resulting in severe delays. Initially, it was believed that the derailment was caused by the train colliding with debris while passing Yeongdong Tunnel. However, evidence gathered from further investigation show that the missing bogie wheel was found inside Otan Tunnel, which is about 4 km before Yeongdong Tunnel, leading the investigating team to believe the train derailed due to faults within the wheel bogie assembly rather than from impact with debris. The exact cause and sequence of the derailment is still under investigation.

Passenger comfort and convenience

Passenger surveys in the first months found that the limited capacity of bus connections and the lack of subway connections for intermediate stations, especially the newly built stations Gwangmyeong and Cheonan-Asan, was the problem mentioned most often.  A better connection to Cheonan-Asan Station was provided by an extension of Seoul Subway Line 1 along the Janghang Line, opened on December 14, 2008.  Gwangmyeong Station was linked to the same subway line by a shuttle service on December 15, 2006, but it made little impact due to the longtime differences between KTX and subway train schedules.

The noise level in the trains during tunnel passages was also subject to passenger complaints. This was referred to as a tunnel effect; it referred to both noise and vibration of the train when traveling through two specific tunnels. The tunnel effect was specifically noted as a reason for passenger dissatisfaction. Sound waves that are generally dispersed in an open environment are reflected against the tunnel walls, which causes the sound waves to come in contact with the passenger cabin and produces noise.

A reduction by 3–4 dB was achieved by retrofitting all trains with longer mud flaps at car ends until May 2006 to smooth the airflow at the articulated car joints. However, measurements in 2009 found significantly higher interior noise levels at some locations in two tunnels. Window thickness and sound insulation was improved in the KTX-II. The rails for high-speed trains like the KTX are welded together via a special techniques that make the rail a solid continuous rail; this method reduces the noise volume, which is produced by the wheels' contact with the rail, but it is not fully eliminated.

The isolation of KTX-I trains against pressure variations during tunnel passages was insufficient for some passengers, leading to efforts to reinforce pressurization in newer generations of trains. Pressure variations have been known to cause passengers to experience ringing in their ears; the ventilation systems on the passenger cabins are sealed when the train enters a tunnel in order to reduce the pressure changes. Pressure variations were not the only train cabin-associated complaint; KTX passengers were also known to have been negatively affected by inconsistent speeds of the trains.

Some KTX passengers found high-speed travel in backwards facing seats dizzying. Along with dizziness, feelings of nausea, headache, and sleepiness could also be experienced. Motion sickness was also noted as having had a minimal effect on KTX passengers; however, it still made an impact on passenger ride comfort. When the original seats were selected for the KTX trains, the anthropometry of the main consumers, who were largely expected to be Korean, were not considered. The seat design was found to have a significant effect on how passengers on the KTX trains rated the experience of their trip. Among the various factors that were considered to be vectors of discomfort were the angle of joints and specific areas of pressure, which were discovered to be present after an analysis of questionnaires that were completed by recent passengers. The factors of the seats of concern to KTX passengers were the shape, pitch, width, and the amount of legroom between the rows of seats. Swivel seats, which can be turned into the direction of travel, installed only on First Class in KTX-I trains, were made standard on both classes on newer generations of trains.

Studies have shown that term "ride comfort" has been used as an all-encompassing term for the KTX passengers' over all experience on the trains. While the KTX train is based on the French TGV model, it is considered to be more comfortable. The passengers' overall experience with regards to over-all ride comfort has been looked at as a combination of their physical health and emotional state. Fares were not included in the aforementioned questionnaires on ride comfort as there were variations in pricing due to seat arrangement, as well as weekday/weekend rates.

See also

 Tilting Train Express
 Transport in South Korea
 Train to Busan, a horror film in which the KTX features heavily in the plot
 Saemaeul-ho
 Mugunghwa-ho

References
 Citations

 Bibliography

External links

 
 KTX : Visitseoul - Official Seoul City Tourism

 
High-speed rail in South Korea
High-speed trains